The Helena Modrzejewska National Stary Theater in Kraków (Polish: Narodowy Stary Teatr im. Heleny Modrzejewskiej) is one of the oldest public stages in Poland and a national institution of culture, first opened in 1781. It was named after renowned Shakespearean actress Helena Modrzejewska.

History 
The theater was created by Feliks Oraczewski, a member of the Polish Parliament (Sejm), and the actor Mateusz Witkowski. On 17 October 1781 the Cracow city authorities gave Witkowski permission to perform comedy under the condition that he pay fifty Polish zloty a month to the municipal treasury. In 1798, Jacek Kluszewski, the starosta of Brzeg, took over the theater and converted two of his own buildings the corner of Szczepański Square and Jagiellonian Street into its permanent home.

The theatre is regarded as Poland's leading theatre. In 1997 Krystyna Meissner became the director. Her term here was difficult and the following year she left at the request of the actors.

In 2016, the MICET Interactive Museum / Theater Education Center opened in the theater building's 13th century cellars.

References

External links 
 Theater website

Theatres in Kraków
Poland
Theatres completed in 1781
1781 establishments in Europe